Allepipona emortualis is a species of wasp in the Vespidae family. It was described by Saussure in 1853.

References

Potter wasps
Insects described in 1853